Kea Lynn Whetzal Riggs (born 1965) is an American attorney and jurist serving as a United States district judge of the United States District Court for the District of New Mexico.

Education 

Riggs was born in Midwest City, Oklahoma. She earned her Bachelor of Business Administration from the University of Oklahoma and her Juris Doctor from the University of Oklahoma College of Law.

Career 

Riggs worked in private practice with Sanders, Bruin, Coll, & Worley in Roswell, New Mexico, and served the State of New Mexico as a senior trial prosecutor, children's court attorney, and Assistant District Attorney.

State court service 

She was appointed a Judge of the Fifth Judicial District Court of New Mexico by Governor Susana Martinez on August 8, 2014. Her service on the state district court, which covers the southeastern corner of the state, terminated on December 31, 2019, when she received her commission as a federal judge.

Federal judicial service

Magistrate judge 

Riggs served as a United States magistrate judge of the United States District Court for the District of New Mexico, a position she was appointed to on April 13, 2001, and left on August 8, 2014, upon becoming a state district judge.

District court 

On May 3, 2019, President Donald Trump announced his intent to nominate Riggs to serve as a United States district judge of the United States District Court for the District of New Mexico. On May 13, 2019, her nomination was sent to the Senate to the seat vacated by Judge Christina Armijo, who assumed senior status on February 7, 2018. On June 26, 2019, a hearing on her nomination was held before the Senate Judiciary Committee. On July 18, 2019, her nomination was reported out of committee by voice vote. On December 18, 2019, the United States Senate invoked cloture on her nomination by a 92–1 vote. On December 19, 2019, her nomination was confirmed by a 94–0 vote. She received her judicial commission on December 31, 2019 and was sworn in by Senior Judge Bobby Baldock later that day.

Academics 

She was an adjunct professor at Eastern New Mexico State University–Roswell from 2001 to 2002, 2008 to 2009, and 2012 to 2014. She was adjunct professor at New Mexico Highlands University–Roswell from 2006 to 2009 and again in 2011.

Personal life 

She is married to Stanton Riggs, also an attorney. They have two children.

References

External links 
 
 

1965 births
Living people
20th-century American women lawyers
20th-century American lawyers
21st-century American women lawyers
21st-century American lawyers
21st-century American judges
21st-century American women judges
Eastern New Mexico University faculty
Judges of the United States District Court for the District of New Mexico
New Mexico Highlands University faculty
New Mexico Republicans
New Mexico state court judges
People from Midwest City, Oklahoma
United States magistrate judges
United States district court judges appointed by Donald Trump
University of Oklahoma alumni
University of Oklahoma College of Law alumni
State attorneys